This is a timeline documenting the events of heavy metal in the year 2001.

Newly formed bands

 A Band Called Pain
The Acacia Strain
Acrassicauda
The Agony Scene
Ankla
Årabrot
ASG
Audioslave
 Avatar
Behold... The Arctopus
Black Cobra
 The Black Dahlia Murder
 Black Majesty
Black Stone Cherry
 Blackguard
Bullet
Bury Your Dead
Callisto
Circle II Circle
Cloudscape
Cobalt  
Decrepit Birth
Dragonlord
 Equilibrium
 Galneryus
Ghoul
Hacride
Hinder 
Ion Dissonance 
Jet
Khanate 
Kylesa
Leprous
 Masterplan
Misery Index 
 Municipal Waste
Myrath
Pelican 
Persefone 
 Power Quest
 Protest the Hero
Pyramaze
Rebellion
Redemption 
Riverside 
 Textures
 Seraphim
Serenity 
Silvertide
 Sirenia
Stolen Babies
Suicidal Angels
Volbeat
 WarCry
Wisdom
 Year of Desolation
Year of No Light

Re-formed bands
 Celtic Frost
 Death Angel
 Jane's Addiction
 Rush

Albums

 40 Below Summer - Invitation to the Dance
 Aborted - Engineering the Dead
 Aerosmith - Just Push Play
 After Forever - Decipher
 Akercocke - The Goat of Mendes
 Alice Cooper - Dragontown
 Alice in Chains - Greatest Hits (compilation)
 Alien Ant Farm - Anthology
 American Head Charge - The War of Art
 Amon Amarth - The Crusher
 Amorphis - Am Universum
 Ancient Rites - Dim Carcosa
 Angra - Rebirth
 Anorexia Nervosa - New Obscurantis Order
 Anvil – Plenty of Power
 Arch Enemy - Wages of Sin
 Ark - Burn the Sun
 Arma Angelus - Where Sleeplessness Is Rest from Nightmares
 As I Lay Dying – Beneath the Encasing of Ashes
 Atreyu - Fractures in the Facade of Your Porcelain Beauty (EP)
 Avantasia - The Metal Opera
 Avenged Sevenfold - Sounding the Seventh Trumpet
 Biohazard – Uncivilization
 Black Label Society - Alcohol Fueled Brewtality (live)
 Bolt Thrower - Honour – Valour – Pride
 Bon Jovi - One Wild Night Live 1985–2001 (live)
 Breach - Kollapse
 Bruce Dickinson - The Best of Bruce Dickinson (compilation)
 Cathedral - Endtyme
 Chimaira - Pass Out of Existence
 Creed - Weathered
 Converge - Jane Doe
 Cradle of Filth - Bitter Suites to Succubi (EP)
 Darkane - Insanity (album)
 Dark Funeral - Diabolis Interium
 Destruction - The Antichrist
 Devin Townsend - Terria
 Dimmu Borgir - Puritanical Euphoric Misanthropia
 Divinity Destroyed - Nocturnal Dawn
 Dope - Life
 Drowning Pool - Sinner
 Edguy - Mandrake
 Emperor - Prometheus: The Discipline of Fire & Demise
 Ensiferum - Ensiferum
 Enslaved - Monumension
 Entombed – Morning Star
 Envy - All the Footprints You've Ever Left and the Fear Expecting Ahead
 Evergrey - In Search of Truth
 Every Time I Die - Last Night in Town
 Fantômas - The Director's Cut
 Fear Factory - Digimortal
 Finntroll - Jaktens Tid
 Flaw - Through the Eyes
 Freedom Call - Crystal Empire
 From Zero - One Nation Under
 Gamma Ray - No World Order
 God Forbid - Determination
 Godflesh - Hymns
 Godflesh - In All Languages (compilation)
 Gojira - Terra Incognita
 Graveworm – Scourge of Malice
 Gwar – Violence Has Arrived
 Iced Earth - Horror Show
 Ill Nino - Revolution Revolución
 Integrity – Closure
 Jag Panzer – Mechanized Warfare
 Judas Priest - Demolition
 Kamelot - Karma
 King's X - Manic Moonlight
 Kittie - Oracle
 Kreator - Violent Revolution
 Lacuna Coil - Unleashed Memories
 Lifer - Lifer
 Tony MacAlpine - Chromaticity
 Machine Head - Supercharger
 Marduk - La Grande Danse Macabre
 Mass Hysteria - De cercle en cercle
 Mastodon - Lifesblood (EP)
 Megadeth - The World Needs a Hero
 Moonsorrow - Voimasta ja kunniasta
 Moonspell - Darkness and Hope
 Mushroomhead - XX (compilation)
 My Dying Bride - The Dreadful Hours
 Nickelback - Silver Side Up
 No One - No One
 Occult – Rage to Revenge
 Oomph! - Ego
 Opeth - Blackwater Park
 Ozzy Osbourne - Down to Earth
 Pentagram - Sub-Basement
 Pig Destroyer - Prowler in the Yard
 Place of Skulls - Nailed
 P.O.D. - Satellite
 Primer 55 - (the) New Release
 Racer X - Superheroes
 Rage - Welcome to the Other Side
 Rammstein - Mutter
 Reveille - Bleed the Sky
 Reverend - A Gathering of Demons (EP)
 Rhapsody - Rain of a Thousand Flames
 Rollins Band - Nice
 Royal Hunt - The Mission (Royal Hunt album)
 Savatage - Poets and Madmen
 Sepultura - Nation
 Sevendust - Animosity
 Silencer - Death – Pierce Me
 Skillet – Alien Youth
 Skrape - New Killer America
 Slayer - God Hates Us All
 Slipknot - Iowa
 Sodom – M-16
 SOiL - Scars
 Soilwork - A Predator's Portrait
 Solefald - Pills Against the Ageless Ills
 Sonata Arctica - Silence
 Static-X - Machine
 Stratovarius - Intermission (compilation)
 Sum 41 - All Killer No Filler
 Summoning - Let Mortal Heroes Sing Your Fame
 System of a Down - Toxicity
 Theatre of Tragedy - Closure: Live (live)
 Therion - Secret of the Runes
 Throwdown - You Don't Have to Be Blood to Be Family
 Thursday - Full Collapse
 Tomahawk - Tomahawk
 Tool - Lateralus
 Tristania - World of Glass
 Unearth - The Stings of Conscience
 Virgin Black - Sombre Romantic
 Vision of Disorder – From Bliss to Devastation
 Warrant - Under the Influence

Disbandments 
 20 Dead Flower Children
 Emperor
 Death

Events
 Death guitarist Chuck Schuldiner dies at 34 on December 13 of brain cancer.
 Metallica bassist Jason Newsted (who joined after Cliff Burton's death) officially left the band and joined Voivod.
 Former Body Count bassist Mooseman is killed in a drive-by shooting on February 21.
 Nightwish bassist Sami Vänskä is fired.
 Cradle of Filth sign with Epic Records, becoming the first ever black metal band on a major label.
 Kittie guitarist Fallon Bowman quits.
 Limp Bizkit guitarist Wes Borland leaves the band.

References

2000s in heavy metal music
Metal